Vetter is a German language surname, which means "cousin". It may refer to:

People
Anouk Vetter (born 1993), Dutch athlete
Austin Anthony Vetter (born 1967), American Roman Catholic bishop
Brian Vetter (born 1985), American lacrosse player
Conrad Vetter (1547–1622), German writer
Craig Vetter (born 1942), American businessman
Daniel Strejc-Vetterus (1592-1669?), Czech priest, author
Darci Vetter (born 1974), American diplomat
David Vetter (1971–1984), American immunodeficiency sufferer
Fred W. Vetter Jr. (1921–2002), American general
Günter Vetter (1936–2022), Austrian politician
Helmut Vetter (1910–1949), German Nazi SS officer at Auschwitz concentration camp executed for war crimes
Hermann Vetter (born 1933), German translator
Jessica Vetter (born 1985), American ice hockey player
Johannes Vetter (born 1993), German athlete
Karl Vetter (18..-1945), German politician
Louis F. Vetter (1857–1923), American businessman
Michael Vetter (1943–2013), German composer and artist
Nicolaus Vetter (1666–1734), German musician
Richard Vetter (1919-2000), German inventor
Stephanie Vetter (1884–1974), Belgian writer

Other uses
Vetter Fairing Company, an American manufacturer of motorcycle accessories
Vetter Mountain, California
Vetter Pharma, a German pharmaceutical company

See also
Fett
Fetter (disambiguation)
Vater
Vette
Wetter (surname)

German words and phrases
German-language surnames
Surnames from nicknames